The Kunta people (also known as Abakunta or Abasuba) Bantu community living on the eastern shores of Lake Victoria in South Nyanza, Kenya, in the Ngodhe area in Gembe locality and Muhuru Bay area, and the nearby islands, such as Mfangano, Ringiti, Takawiri, Elemba and Rusinga. The Abakunta have been overlooked in both colonial and independent Kenya. The Kenyan government today take them to be Suba people.

References
There are scanty sources as the Abakunta are transforming themselves to Abasuba:

 Okoth-Okombo, Duncan (1999) 'Language and ethnic identity: the case of the Abasuba', Kenya Journal of Sciences (Series C, Humanities and Social Sciences) 5, 1, 21-38.
 Heine, Bernd & Brenzinger, Mathias (eds.) (2003) 'Africa', in UNESCO Red Book of Endangered Languages . (Suba entry )

Bantu peoples